Holmsund may refer to:

Places
Holmsund, a locality situated in Umeå municipality in Västerbotten county, Sweden
Holmsund, Norway, a village in Arendal municipality in Aust-Agder county, Norway
Holmsund, Finnmark, a village in Tana municipality in Finnmark county, Norway

Other
IFK Holmsund, a football team from Holmsund, Sweden
Holmsund (ship), a Swedish ship known as the Holmsund from 1967 to 1997, now called by a different name